John Patrick Joseph McGrath (13 February 1924 – 6 June 2013) was an Australian rules footballer who played with Geelong in the Victorian Football League (VFL).

In his last game he injured his leg, which resulted in him having to finish his VFL career.

Notes

External links 

1924 births
2013 deaths
Australian rules footballers from Victoria (Australia)
Geelong Football Club players